Brainstorm is a 1983 American science fiction film directed by Douglas Trumbull, and starring Christopher Walken, Natalie Wood (in her final film role), Louise Fletcher, and Cliff Robertson.

It follows a research team's efforts to perfect a system that directly records and replays the sensory experiences and emotional feelings of a subject, and the efforts by the company's management to exploit the device for military ends. After a researcher records her own death from a heart attack, her colleagues join forces to retrieve the information and play it back.

Plot 
Scientists invent a brain–computer interface enabling sensations to be recorded from a person's brain and converted to tape for others to experience. The team includes estranged husband and wife Michael and Karen, as well as Michael's colleague Lillian. At CEO Alex's instruction, the team demonstrates the device to investors to gain financing.

Karen dons the recorder while working with Michael and Lillian. When Michael plays the tape back, the group realizes that emotional experiences are also recorded. Michael tapes his memories of times with Karen, which he shares with her, leading to their reconciliation.

Lillian is pressured by backers to admit Landan to the team, whom she sees as part of the military-industrial complex. She disagrees with their plan to have the invention developed for military use.

One team member, Gordy, has sexual intercourse while wearing the recorder, and shares the tape with colleagues, including Hal. Hal splices one section of the tape into a continuous orgasm, which results in sensory overload, leading to his forced retirement. Tensions increase as the possibilities for abuse become clear.

Suffering from heart problems and a constant cigarette smoker, Lillian suffers a heart attack while working alone. Realizing she is about to die, Lillian records her experience.

Michael later decides to experience Lillian's recording, but nearly dies when his body simulates a heart attack. Michael modifies his console to filter the physical output and replays the tape. He sees "memory bubbles"—moments from Lillian's life. Michael experiences Lillian's memories of a humorous exchange with Michael as he plays with an industrial robot, a surprise birthday party, and being devastated when Alex tells her that an earlier project is canceled.

Scientists wanting to discover the machine's military capabilities are monitoring the equipment as Michael plays Lillian's tape. They have Gordy experience the tape, but Landan ignores the advice of the monitoring staff that Michael made modifications to his terminal. Gordy dies from experiencing Lillian's heart attack.

Michael's playback is cut short by Hal, but having witnessed the near-death experience makes Michael curious to see the entire tape. Alex has the recording locked away and tells Michael he will not be allowed to view it. When he returns to work, Michael walks in on Landan and outside technicians going through his research records. Alex responds to his protests by firing Michael and Karen.

Michael attempts to hack into the lab's computers. Hal advises him to look under "Project Brainstorm", a program the military created to use their invention for torture and brainwashing. Michael accesses a tape from his den and quickly stops viewing it because of its disturbing nature.  Michael and Karen's son Chris inadvertently views the tape, causing him to have a psychotic experience that results in his hospitalization. Alex visits and Michael confronts him about Project Brainstorm, blaming Alex for his son's condition. Alex denies any knowledge of the project, then informs Michael of Gordy's death.

Michael vows to destroy his work and enlists the help of Karen and Hal. Michael and Karen head to the Pinehurst Resort, and realizing they are under surveillance, stage a fight that results in Karen leaving for Hal's house. As the two feign reconciliation over the phone, Michael accesses the Brainstorm computer via another phone line while Karen hacks into the system, sabotaging the robots that manufacture the interface terminals.

Karen shuts down the security system, locking the staff outside and enabling Michael to load Lillian's tape and experience it uninterrupted. With the plant in chaos, Robert orders Michael's arrest.

Karen leaves the house to meet with Michael. Hal and his wife, Wendy, send the last of Karen's commands to the company computers, shutting down the plant.

Karen meets with Michael while the tape is playing. Michael bears witness to the afterlife, experiencing a vision of hell, then traveling from Earth and through the universe, even after the tape ends. He ultimately has visions of angels and departed souls flying into a great cosmic Light. Michael then collapses. Karen sobs, believing him dead. She pleads for Michael to stay alive. Awakening from the experience, he weeps with joy and embraces Karen.

Cast 

 Christopher Walken as Dr. Michael Brace
 Natalie Wood as Karen Brace
 Louise Fletcher as Dr. Lillian Reynolds 
 Cliff Robertson as Alex Terson
 Jordan Christopher as Gordy Forbes
 Donald Hotton as Dr. Landan Marks
 Alan Fudge as Robert Jenkins, project manager for project Brainstorm
 Joe Dorsey as Hal Abramson 
 Bill Morey as James Zimbach
 Jason Lively as Chris Brace
 Georgianne Walken as Wendy Abramson

Production 
To prepare for the film, Trumbull took most of the key cast and crew to the Esalen Institute, an experimental research facility in Northern California known for its new-age classes and workshops. In September 1981, the cast and crew traveled to North Carolina to begin six weeks of shooting at locations including the Elion-Hitchings Building in Research Triangle Park and Duke University, then returned to the Metro-Goldwyn-Mayer Studios in Culver City, California in November to film interior scenes.

Natalie Wood's death 
The film was nearly scuttled by Natalie Wood's death during a production break in November 1981. By this time, Wood had already completed all of her major scenes, but due to mounting financial problems, MGM took Wood's death as an opportunity to terminate the already troubled production. "When she died," said Trumbull, "all the sets were locked and frozen on all the stages. No one could get in or out without special permission while all the negotiations took place."

Trumbull believed that financially strapped MGM simply got cold feet about providing the remainder of the funds to complete Brainstorm. "MGM's problem was that insurance institution Lloyd's of London, when it took depositions from me and other people, realized that the film could be finished. Why should they pay an insurance claim for something that really wasn't damaged goods?" When MGM refused to pay for the film to be completed, Lloyd's of London provided $2.75 million for Trumbull to complete principal photography and an additional $3.5 million towards post-production. Meanwhile, other studios showed interest in buying Brainstorm from MGM to release as their own production. "MGM decided to allow Lloyd's of London to offer the film to many of the major studios in town," said Trumbull. "Several of them made bids to MGM. And the studio suddenly realized that a lot of other people in this town were excited about Brainstorm, and were ready to put up millions of dollars. MGM figured they'd look like jerks if they let it go and it turned out to be a big success. So they finally decided to work out this deal where Lloyd's of London would put up the remaining money and become a profit participant."

Trumbull proceeded to complete the film by rewriting the script and using Natalie Wood's younger sister Lana for Wood's few remaining scenes.

The film carries the dedication credit "To Natalie".

Effects 
The film was conceived as an introduction to Trumbull's Showscan 60 frames-per-second 70 mm film process. "In movies people often do flashbacks and point-of-view shots as a gauzy, mysterious, distant kind of image," Trumbull recalled. "And I wanted to do just the opposite, which was to make the material of the mind even more real and high-impact than 'reality'".

MGM withdrew its plans to release the experimental picture in the new format. Trumbull instead shot the virtual reality sequences in 24 frames-per-second Super Panavision 70 with an aspect ratio of 2.2:1. The rest of the film was shot in conventional 35mm with an aspect ratio of approximately 1.7 to 1.

Soundtrack 
The score to Brainstorm was composed and conducted by James Horner, it won him the Saturn Award for Best Music in 1983. The Varèse Sarabande album/CD release is a re-recording with the London Symphony Orchestra, produced shortly before the original theatrical release.

Reception 
Brainstorm was released on September 30, 1983, almost two years after Wood's death. However, it opened on a small number of screens and with little publicity despite being lauded unofficially as "Natalie Wood's last movie". Rotten Tomatoes reports that 57% of 21 critics have given the film a positive review with an average rating of 5.69/10.

Janet Maslin of the New York Times gave particular credit to Louise Fletcher's "superb performance". Christopher John reviewed Brainstorm in Ares Magazine Special Edition #2 and commented that "For those looking for nothing more than the same old spaceships and monsters, well, this one probably isn't for you – but then again, you've got all the movies you need this year. Brainstorm is for the rest of us." Roger Ebert of The Chicago Sun-Times gave the film a mixed 2 stars out of a possible 4, describing the premise as "a good idea for a movie" and credited Trumbull with providing "intriguing" special effects. However, Ebert thought the cast was not used well: "The characters take such a secondary importance to the gadget that we never feel much for them."

The film was not a commercial success, with a production budget of $18 million and grossing only $10 million in ticket sales in North America.

Because of the immensely troubled production and disagreements with MGM, Trumbull opted never to direct a Hollywood film again. In 1983 he stated:  In 2013, he explained that the uncertain circumstances of Natalie Wood's death were the main reason for this decision. He later returned to filmmaking.

Accolades 
At the 11th Saturn Awards, Brainstorm won Best Actress for Louise Fletcher and Best Music for James Horner. It also received nominations for Best Science Fiction Film, Best Director, Best Special Effects and a posthumous Best Supporting Actress nomination for Natalie Wood.

See also 

 1983 in film
 Artificial reality
 Augmented reality
 Autonomous sensory meridian response, or ASMR
 Brain-computer interface
 BrainGate
 Flight simulation
 Simulated reality
 Virtual reality
 Thought recording and reproduction device
 The Dream Master (1966)
 Tron (1982)
 Dreamscape (1984)
 Strange Days (1995)
 eXistenZ (1999)
 Paprika (2006)
 Rememory (2017)

References

External links 
 
 
 
 
 Excerpt

1983 films
1980s science fiction thriller films
American science fiction thriller films
Brain–computer interfacing in fiction
Films about telepresence
Films about technological impact
Films scored by James Horner
Films shot from the first-person perspective
Films shot in North Carolina
Metaphysical fiction films
Metro-Goldwyn-Mayer films
Techno-thriller films
Films about the afterlife
1980s English-language films
Films directed by Douglas Trumbull
1980s American films